Gradini is a village in General Toshevo Municipality, Dobrich Province, northeastern Bulgaria.

References

Villages in Dobrich Province